Thomas Belesis was the founder and CEO of John Thomas Financial, a New York City-based financial services company that was shut down when financial regulators accused him of fraud and the business of being a boiler room.

Career 
Belesis founded John Thomas Financial in 2007 after a career in brokerage and investment banking on Wall Street. It grew from a three-person brokerage to 300-employee firm that claimed to provide a full range of retail brokerage, investment banking, corporate advisory and private wealth management services.

Belesis was often invited by the leading news outlets to discuss macroeconomic trends and economic policy. He appears regularly on broadcast media, including Fox Business News and CNBC. He is also active in New York State and national politics. In spring 2011, he was appointed Co-Chairman of the New York State Finance Committee for the Republican Party.

Belesis played both on- and offscreen roles on the movie Wall Street: Money Never Sleeps, appearing as a trader alongside Jacob "Jake" Moore (Shia LaBeouf) and serving as advisor to Oliver Stone, helping the director to capture a more authentic view of Wall Street.

In 2009, he was presented with the Bronx Republican Party "Man of the Year" award by Rudolph Giuliani, who commented on his rise "from humble beginnings to become a great success on Wall Street" and his role in providing jobs to young people on Wall Street. Greek America Magazine named Belesis one of its 25 Most Intriguing People of 2010.

The New York Post looked into the "shady" past of Belesis in a series of articles beginning in 2012. In early 2013, another series of New York Post articles covered an investigation by the Financial Industry Regulatory Authority (FINRA) into the dealings of John Thomas Financial. Other articles in Bloomberg interviewed former employees and questioned whether the business practices and sales tactics of John Thomas Financial constituted those of a boiler room.

SEC Investigation 
On 22 March 2013, the United States Securities and Exchange Commission (SEC) announced charges against Belesis, alleging that he and an influential, Houston-based, radio host defrauded investors in two hedge funds.  The charges allege that George R. Jarkesy Jr., worked closely with Belesis to launch two hedge funds that raised $30 million from investors. Jarkesy and his firm John Thomas Capital Management (since renamed Patriot28 LLC) inflated valuations of the funds' assets, causing the value of investors' shares to be overstated and his management and incentive fees to be increased. Jarkesy, a frequent media commentator and radio talk show host, also lied to investors about the identity of the funds' auditor and prime broker. Meanwhile, although they shared the same "John Thomas" brand name, Jarkesy's firm and Belesis' firm John Thomas Financial were portrayed as wholly independent. Jarkesy led investors to believe that as manager of the funds, he was solely responsible for all investment decisions. However, Belesis sometimes supplanted Jarkesy as the decision maker and directed some investments from the hedge funds into a company in which his firm was heavily invested. Belesis also bullied Jarkesy into showering excessive fees on John Thomas Financial even in instances where the firm had done virtually nothing to earn them.

On one occasion cited by the SEC, after Belesis yelled at the fund manager, Jarkesy tried to reassure him by saying in an e-mail: "We will always try to get you as much as possible, every time without exception!"

The hedge funds, called John Thomas Bridge and Opportunity Fund LP I and II, have about 120 investors, the SEC said. The funds listed inflated valuations for their holdings on monthly statements, which were the basis for calculating Jarkesy's fees, according to the regulators.

From 2008 to 2010, John Thomas was paid $488,750 in fees for four bridge loans, including two for which it did "nearly inconsequential work," according to the regulators. Jarkesy and his firm also paid John Thomas $741,000 in brokerage commissions and about $2.5 million in placement fees, the SEC said.

References

https://www.sec.gov/news/press/2013/2013-46.htm
https://www.bloomberg.com/news/2013-03-22/hedge-fund-manager-said-by-sec-to-steer-bloated-fee-to-belesis.html

External links
Further information on CEO and President Thomas Belesis

Living people
American financial businesspeople
American chief executives of financial services companies
Businesspeople from New York City
Year of birth missing (living people)